Steven David Levitt (born May 29, 1967) is an American economist and co-author of the best-selling book Freakonomics and its sequels (along with Stephen J. Dubner). Levitt was the winner of the 2003 John Bates Clark Medal for his work in the field of crime, and is currently the William B. Ogden Distinguished Service Professor of Economics at the University of Chicago as well as the Faculty Director and Co-Founder of the Center for Radical Innovation for Social Change at the University of Chicago  which incubates the Data Science for Everyone coalition. He was co-editor of the Journal of Political Economy published by the University of Chicago Press until December 2007. In 2009, Levitt co-founded TGG Group, a business and philanthropy consulting company. He was chosen as one of Time magazine's "100 People Who Shape Our World" in 2006. A 2011 survey of economics professors named Levitt their fourth favorite living economist under the age of 60, after Paul Krugman, Greg Mankiw and Daron Acemoglu.

Career
Levitt attended St. Paul Academy and Summit School in St. Paul, Minnesota. He graduated from Harvard University in 1989 with his AB in economics summa cum laude, writing his senior thesis on rational bubbles in horse breeding, and then worked as a consultant at Corporate Decisions, Inc. (CDI) in Boston advising Fortune 500 companies. He received his PhD in economics from MIT in 1994. He is currently the William B. Ogden Distinguished Service Professor and the director of Gary Becker Milton Friedman Institute for Research in Economics at the University of Chicago. In 2003 he won the John Bates Clark Medal, awarded every two years by the American Economic Association to the most promising U.S. economist under the age of 40.
In April 2005 Levitt published his first book, Freakonomics (coauthored with Stephen J. Dubner), which became a New York Times bestseller.  Levitt and Dubner also started a blog devoted to Freakonomics.

Work
His work on various economics topics, including crime, politics and sports, includes over 60 academic publications. For example, his An Economic Analysis of a Drug-Selling Gang's Finances (2000) analyzes a hand-written "accounting" of a criminal gang, and draws conclusions about the income distribution among gang members. In his most well-known and controversial paper (The Impact of Legalized Abortion on Crime (2001), co-authored with John Donohue), he shows that the legalization of abortion in the US in 1973 was followed approximately eighteen years later by a considerable reduction in crime, then argues that unwanted children commit more crime than wanted children and that the legalization of abortion resulted in fewer unwanted children, and thus a reduction in crime as these children reached the age at which many criminals begin committing crimes.

Crime
Among other papers, Levitt's work on crime includes examination of the effects of prison population, police hiring, availability of LoJack anti-theft devices and legal status of abortion on crime rates.

The impact of legalized abortion on crime

Revisiting a question first studied empirically in the 1960s, Donohue and Levitt argued that the legalization of abortion could account for almost half of the reduction in crime witnessed in the 1990s. This paper sparked much controversy, to which Levitt has said
". . . John Donohue and I estimate maybe that there are 5,000 or 10,000 fewer homicides because of it. But if you think that a fetus is like a person, then that’s a horrible tradeoff. So ultimately I think our study is interesting because it helps us understand why crime has gone down. But in terms of policy towards abortion, you’re really misguided if you use our study to base your opinion about what the right policy is towards abortion"

In 2003, Theodore Joyce argued that legalized abortion had little impact on crime, contradicting Donohue and Levitt's results. In 2004, the authors published a response, in which they claimed Joyce's argument was flawed due to omitted-variable bias.

In November 2005, Federal Reserve Bank of Boston economist Christopher Foote and his research assistant Christopher Goetz, published a paper, in which they argued that the results in Donohue and Levitt's paper were due to statistical errors made by the authors. When the corrections were made, Foote and Goetz argued that abortion actually increased violent crime instead of decreasing it.

In January 2006, Donohue and Levitt published a response, in which they admitted the errors in their original paper, but also pointed out that Foote and Goetz's correction was flawed due to heavy attenuation bias. The authors argued that, after making necessary changes to fix the original errors, the corrected link between abortion and crime was now weaker but still statistically significant.

In 2019, Levitt and Donohue published a new paper to review the predictions of the original 2001 paper. The authors concluded that the original predictions held up with strong effects. "We estimate that crime fell roughly 20% between 1997 and 2014 due to legalized abortion. The cumulative impact of legalized abortion on crime is roughly 45%, accounting for a very substantial portion of the roughly 50-55% overall decline from the peak of crime in the early 1990s."

Levitt discusses this paper and the background and history of the original paper (including its criticisms) in an episode of the Freakonomics podcast.

Prison population
Levitt's 1996 paper on prison population uses prison overcrowding litigation to estimate that decreasing the prison population by one person is associated with an increase of fifteen Index I crimes per year (Index I crimes include homicide, forcible rape, robbery, aggravated assault, burglary, theft, motor vehicle theft, and arson).

Police hiring
In a 1997 paper on the effect of police hiring on crime rates, Levitt used the timing of mayoral and gubernatorial elections as an instrumental variable to identify a causal effect of police on crime. Past studies had been inconclusive because of the simultaneity inherent in police hiring (when crime increases, more police are hired to combat crime). The findings of this paper were found to be the result of a programming error. This was pointed out in a comment by Justin McCrary published in the American Economic Review in 2002. In a response published with McCrary's comment Levitt admits to the error and then goes on to offer alternative evidence to support his original conclusions. Levitt's 1997 paper was also criticized in another comment that demonstrates the weakness of the instrumental variables used in the original study, rendering the interpretation difficult if not impossible.

LoJack
Ayres and Levitt (1998) used a new dataset on the prevalence of LoJack automobile anti-theft devices to estimate the social externality associated with its use. They find that the marginal social benefit of Lojack is fifteen times greater than the marginal social cost in high crime areas, but that those who install LoJack obtain less than ten percent of the total social benefits.

Criminal age
Another 1998 paper finds that juvenile criminals are at least as responsive to criminal sanctions as adults. Sharp drops in crime at the age of maturity suggest that deterrence plays an important role in the decision to commit a crime.

Finances of a drug gang
Levitt and Sudhir Alladi Venkatesh (2000) analyzed a unique dataset which details the financial activities of a drug-selling street gang. They found that wage earnings in the gang were somewhat higher than legal market alternatives, but did not offset the increased risks associated with selling drugs. They suggested that the prospect of high future earnings is the primary economic motivation for being in a gang.

Link between drunk driving and accident rates
Levitt and Porter (2001) found that drivers with alcohol in their blood are seven times more likely to cause a fatal crash than sober drivers (those above the legal limit are 13 times more likely than sober drivers).  They estimate that the externality per mile driven by a drunk driver is at least thirty cents, which implies that the proper fine to internalize this cost is roughly $8,000.

Cheating in sumo wrestling and by teachers in schools
Duggan and Levitt (2002) showed how non-linear payoff schemes establish incentives for corruption and the authors used the non-linearity to provide substantial statistical evidence that cheating is taking place in Japanese sumo wrestling. Brian Jacob and Levitt (2003) developed an algorithm to detect teachers who cheat for their students on standardized tests. They found that the observed frequency of cheating appears to respond strongly to relatively minor changes in incentives.

Politics
Levitt's work on politics includes papers on the effects of campaign spending, on the median voter theorem, and on the effects of federal spending.

Levitt's 1994 paper on campaign spending employs a unique identification strategy to control for the quality of each candidate (which in previous work had led to an overstatement of the true effect). It concludes that campaign spending has a very small impact on election outcomes, regardless of who does the spending. On the subject of federal spending and elections, previous empirical studies were not able to establish that members of Congress are rewarded by the electorate for bringing federal dollars to their district because of omitted variables bias.  Levitt and Snyder (1997) employ an instrument which circumvents this problem and finds evidence that federal spending benefits congressional incumbents; they find that an additional $100 per capita spending is worth as much as 2 percent of the popular vote.

The 1996 paper on the median voter theorem develops a methodology for consistently estimating the relative weights in a senator's utility function and casts doubt on the median voter theorem, finding that the senator's own ideology is the primary determinant of roll-call voting patterns.

Other studies
 Showed that the consumer benefits of ridesharing in the United States was at least $7 billion a year (2015 prices).
 Testing Mixed-Strategy Equilibria When Players Are Heterogeneous: The Case of Penalty Kicks in Soccer (2002): Chiappori, Levitt, and Groseclose use penalty kicks from soccer games to test the idea of mixed strategies, a concept important to game theory.  They do not reject the hypothesis that players choose their strategies optimally.
 Causes and consequences of distinctively black names (2004): Fryer and Levitt find that the rise in distinctively black names took place in the early 1970s.  While previous studies found having a black name harmful, they conclude that having a distinctively black name is primarily a consequence rather than a cause of poverty and segregation.
 Discrimination in game shows (2004): Levitt uses contestant voting behavior on the US version of the television show Weakest Link to distinguish between taste-based discrimination and information-based discrimination theories of discrimination.  Levitt found no discrimination against females or blacks, while finding taste-based discrimination against the old and information-based discrimination against Hispanics.

Selected bibliography

Academic publications (in chronological order)
 "Four essays in positive political economy" PhD Thesis, DSpace@MIT. Massachusetts Institute of Technology, Dept. of Economics, 1994.
 "Using Repeat Challengers to Estimate the Effect of Campaign Spending on Election Outcomes in the U.S. House." Journal of Political Economy, 1994, 102(4), pp. 777–98.
 "How Do Senators Vote? Disentangling the Role of Voter Preferences, Party Affiliation, and Senator Ideology." American Economic Review, 1996, 86(3), pp. 425–41.
 "The Effect of Prison Population Size on Crime Rates: Evidence from Prison Overcrowding Litigation." Quarterly Journal of Economics, 1996, 111(2), pp. 319–51.
 "The Impact of Federal Spending on House Election Outcomes." Journal of Political Economy, 1997, 105(1), pp. 30–53. (with Snyder, James M. Jr.).
 "Using Electoral Cycles in Police Hiring to Estimate the Effect of Police on Crime." American Economic Review, 1997, 87(3), pp. 270–90.
 "Measuring Positive Externalities from Unobservable Victim Precaution: An Empirical Analysis of Lojack." Quarterly Journal of Economics, 1998, 113(1), pp. 43–77 (with Ayres, Ian).
 
 "An Economic Analysis of a Drug-Selling Gang's Finances." Quarterly Journal of Economics, 2000, 115(3), pp. 755–89. (with Venkatesh, Sudhir A.).
 "The Impact of Legalized Abortion on Crime." Quarterly Journal of Economics, 2001, 116(2), pp. 379–420. (with Donohue, John J., III).
 "How Dangerous Are Drinking Drivers?" Journal of Political Economy, 2001, 109(6), pp. 1198–237. (with Porter, Jack) .
 "Testing Mixed-Strategy Equilibria When Players Are Heterogeneous: The Case of Penalty Kicks in Soccer." American Economic Review, 2002, 92, pp. 1138–51 (With Chiappori, Pierre-Andre and Groseclose, Timothy).
 "Winning Isn't Everything: Corruption in Sumo Wrestling." American Economic Review, 2002, 92(5), pp. 1594–605. (with Duggan, Mark).
 "Using Electoral Cycles in Police Hiring to Estimate the Effects of Police on Crime: Reply." American Economic Review, 2002, 92(4), pp. 1244–50.
 "Rotten Apples: An Investigation of the Prevalence and Predictors of Teacher Cheating" Quarterly Journal of Economics, 2003, 118(3), pp. 843–77. (with Jacob, Brian A.).
 "The Causes and Consequences of Distinctively Black Names." Quarterly Journal of Economics, 2004, 119(3), pp. 767–805. (with Fryer, Roland G. Jr.)

Other publications (in chronological order)
 Freakonomics:  A Rogue Economist Explores the Hidden Side of Everything, co-author with Stephen Dubner,  (2005)
 SuperFreakonomics: Global Cooling, Patriotic Prostitutes, and Why Suicide Bombers Should Buy Life Insurance, co-author with Stephen Dubner (2009)
 Think Like a Freak: The Authors of Freakonomics Offer to Retrain Your Brain, co-author with Stephen Dubner (2014)
 When to Rob a Bank: ...And 131 More Warped Suggestions and Well-Intended Rants, co-author with Stephen Dubner (2015)

See also

References

External links
 Author profile at HarperCollins
 Ubben Lecture at DePauw University, November 30, 2009
 
 
 
 
 
 Audio of Steven Levitt on NPR's The Motley Fool, April 29, 2005. Duration: 12 mins.

Press
 Stephen Dubner (2003), New York Times Magazine, The Economist of Odd Questions: Inside the Astonishingly Curious Mind of Steven D. Levitt
 Profile of Steven Levitt in the Financial Times, 23 April 2005
 20 Questions with Levitt in CEO Magazine

American bloggers
Economists from Illinois
20th-century American economists
21st-century American economists
Education economists
Harvard University alumni
MIT School of Humanities, Arts, and Social Sciences alumni
People from Oak Park, Illinois
University of Chicago faculty
American podcasters
20th-century American Jews
1967 births
Living people
Fellows of the Econometric Society
21st-century American non-fiction writers
21st-century American Jews
Journal of Political Economy editors